Thomas Earl Dixon (born April 23, 1955) is a former Major League Baseball pitcher from 1977 to 1983 for the Houston Astros and Montreal Expos.

External links

Venezuelan Professional Baseball League

1955 births
Living people
American expatriate baseball players in Canada
Baseball players from Orlando, Florida
Cardenales de Lara players
Charleston Charlies players
Columbus Astros players
Dubuque Packers players
Gulf Coast Cardinals players
Houston Astros players
Leones del Caracas players
American expatriate baseball players in Venezuela
Major League Baseball pitchers
Montreal Expos players
St. Petersburg Cardinals players
Syracuse Chiefs players
Tidewater Tides players
Wichita Aeros players
William R. Boone High School alumni